John L. Scott Jr. (born October 21, 1953) is an American politician and member of the Democratic Party who has represented the Columbia-based 19th district of the South Carolina Senate since 2009. He previously represented the Columbia-based 77th district of the South Carolina House of Representatives from 1991 to 2009.

He considered running for the Democratic nomination for the United States Senate in the 2014 special election.

Scott serves as a member of the College and University Trustee Screening Commission, a Joint Committee with members from the House and Senate. He serves on the Senate Banking and Insurance; Education; Finance; Labor, Commerce and Industry; Legislative Oversight, and Medical Affairs Committees.

References

External links
 https://web.archive.org/web/20080509184951/http://www.scstatehouse.net/members/bios/1640908894.html
 http://www.scstatehouse.net/sess112_1997-1998/bills/5182.htm
 http://www.votesmart.org/issue_rating_category.php?can_id=8946

|-

1953 births
Living people
Democratic Party members of the South Carolina House of Representatives
Democratic Party South Carolina state senators
21st-century American politicians